Camilimanda is a village in Tarsus  district of Mersin Province, Turkey. It is situated in Çukurova (Cilicia of the antiquity) plains between Çukurova motorway and state road . . The population of Camilimanda was 311 as of 2012.

References

Villages in Tarsus District